Soghati (Persian: سوغاتی) is one of the most famous songs in the history of Persian pop music. 

Soghati, which means souvenir in Persian, was performed by Hayedeh in 1976 in Tehran.

The composer of Soghati is Mohammad Heydari, the lyricist Ardalan Sarfaraz. The song was arranged for orchestra by Naser Cheshmazar.

Mohammad Hedydari in the documentary "Hayedeh Legendary Persian Diva" announces: "First it was planned that we record the song with Mahasti but I do not know what happened that Hayedeh performed that finally...".

After Hayedeh's death various versions of the song have been presented by other Persian singers and musicians presented various versions of this song. It has also become known more widely through a Spanish translation by the Israeli singer-songwriter of Judeo-Spanish music, Yasmin Levy.

Persian music
Persian pop music